The Salesgirl from the Fashion Store is a 1925 German silent comedy film directed by Wolfgang Neff and starring Reinhold Schünzel, Lilly Flohr and Evi Eva.

The film's sets were designed by the art director Alfred Junge.

Cast
 Reinhold Schünzel
 Lilly Flohr
 Evi Eva
 Olga Engl
 Margarete Kupfer
 Claire Rommer
 Anna von Palen
 Karl Beckersachs
 Hans Junkermann
 Gerhard Ritterband
 Karl Harbacher
 Siegfried Berisch

References

Bibliography
 Bock, Hans-Michael & Bergfelder, Tim. The Concise CineGraph. Encyclopedia of German Cinema. Berghahn Books, 2009.
 Jennifer M. Kapczynski & Michael D. Richardson. A New History of German Cinema. Boydell & Brewer, 2014.

External links

1925 films
Films of the Weimar Republic
German silent feature films
Films directed by Wolfgang Neff
German black-and-white films
German comedy films
1926 comedy films
1926 films
Films based on German novels
1925 comedy films
Silent comedy films
1920s German films